Painswick House is a grade I listed house in Painswick, Gloucestershire, England. It is surrounded by a Grade II* listed rococo garden.

The house and a range of outbuildings were built in the 1730s by Charles Hyett to escape the smog of Gloucester but Hyett died in 1738 not long after moving there. He demolished an earlier farmhouse which stood on the site. It was originally known as "Buenos Ayres". Around 1830 the house was extended by George Basevi adding the east and west wings.

The limestone building has tiled roofs.  The nine-bay front has a central door set in an Ionic porch with a pediment. The interior of the building has many original fireplaces and makes extensive use of friezes for decoration.

The grounds include the Painswick Rococo Garden, as it is now known, which was laid out by Charles's oldest son Benjamin Hyett II (1708-62) (brother of Nicholas Hyett, constable and keeper of the Castle of Gloucester). The garden was painted by Thomas Robins the Elder in 1748. Robins's painting allowed the garden to be restored in the 1990s under the direction of Painswick's owner, Lord Dickinson, who inherited the house in 1955.

The garden is the only surviving garden of the rococo period which is open to the public. It was designed and laid out in the 1740s. The garden has been restored since 1984 having been abandoned in the 1950s. It includes woodland, flower and vegetable plots, garden buildings and a maze. Several snowdrops, particularly Galanthus 'Atkinsii' are found in the grounds.  There are a series of ponds and streams on the slopes of the valley with small waterfalls.

References

External links

Grade I listed houses in Gloucestershire
Painswick
Hyett family
Grade II* listed parks and gardens in Gloucestershire